2017 Blaublitz Akita season. The annual club slogan was "突". The team won the first J3 title on December 3, 2017

Squad
As of  2017.

J3 League

Standings

Emperor's Cup

Other games

Gallery

References

External links
 J.League official site

Blaublitz Akita
Blaublitz Akita seasons